The 2012 Indiana Hoosiers football team represented Indiana University Bloomington during the 2012 NCAA Division I FBS football season. The Hoosiers competed in the Leaders Division of the Big Ten Conference and played their home games at Memorial Stadium in Bloomington, Indiana. The team was led by head coach Kevin Wilson, who was in his second season. They finished the season 4–8, 2–6 in Big Ten play to place fifth in the Leaders Division.

Preseason

Recruits

Schedule

Roster

References

Indiana
Indiana Hoosiers football seasons
Indiana Hoosiers football